PAJ stands for

 PAJ (journal), originally Performing Arts Journal, a triannual art magazine
 Parachinar Airport's IATA code
 Industrial Property Digital Library or Patent Abstracts of Japan, a database of English abstracts of Japanese patent documents
 Petroleum Association of Japan